Willie Horace Thomas "Tiger" Tams (1891–1980) was a British entomologist.

List of publications

Tams, W.H.T., 1924a. II. Notes on some species of the genus Cosmophila Boisd.. - Trans. Ent. Soc. Lond. pp. 20–24, Plates I.-III.
Tams, W.H.T., 1924b. List of the moths collected in Siam by E.J. Godfrey, B.Sc., F.E.S., with descriptions of new species. J. nat. Hist. Soc. Siam 6: 229–289.
Tams, W.H.T., 1935. Lepidoptera: Heterocera (exclusive of Geometridae and the Microlepidoptera). Insects of Samoa and other Samoan terrestrial arthropods, Part III(4): 169-290
Tams W.H.T., 1936. Three New East African Moths. - Journal of The East Africa and Uganda Natural History Society Cil.XIII: 105-106.
Tams, W.H.T., 1953. A pest of coconut palms in Portuguese East Africa. - Bull. Br. Mus. (Nat. Hist.) Ent., vol.3:69-73

References

External links
 www.nhm.ac.uk - National History Museum: Bibliographic record on W.H.T.Tams
 

British entomologists
British lepidopterists
1891 births
1980 deaths
20th-century British zoologists